KJML (107.1 FM) is a radio station broadcasting an active rock format. Licensed to Columbus, Kansas, United States, the station serves the Joplin area.  The station is owned by American Media Investments Inc.

History
The station went on the air on December 25, 1982 as KBLT.  On October 10, 1988, the station changed its call sign to KMOQ as "Q 107". On January 18, 2008 the KMOQ call sign and the CHR format were swapped with the KJML call sign and active rock format that had been broadcast on 105.3 FM in Columbus. On February 19, 2009, the call sign was changed to KBZI which had been on the now defunct 100.7 FM frequency. The format never ended up changing from the active rock to the Hot AC that had been on 100.7 FM and the call sign was quickly changed back to KJML on November 16, 2009. KJML had been at 105.3 before that it was KOCD CD105.3 which now is called CD103.7 and is licensed to Okemah, Oklahoma.

References

External links
Rock 107.1 Online

JML
Active rock radio stations in the United States